Cormier Aerodrome  is a registered aerodrome located  northwest of Cormier-Village, New Brunswick, Canada.

References

Registered aerodromes in New Brunswick
Transport in Westmorland County, New Brunswick
Buildings and structures in Westmorland County, New Brunswick